Starseed is a proposed method of launching interstellar nanoprobes at one-third light speed.

The launcher uses a 1,000 km-long small-diameter hollow wire, with electrodes lining the hollow wire, an electrostatic accelerator tube, similar to K. Eric Drexler's ideas.  The launcher is designed to accelerate its probes to 1/3 the speed of light, about 100,000 kilometers per second, at something on the order of 100 million gravities of acceleration.

Keeping the launch tube straight enough to avoid the probe hitting the tube walls is a major challenge. The launcher would have to be set up in deep space, well away from any planets, to avoid gravitational tide effects bending the tube too much.

The proposed starseed probes would be extremely small (roughly one microgram) nanomachines and nanocomputers. The required launch energy per probe would be low due to the low mass, and many nanoprobes would be launched in sequence and rendezvous in flight.

References 
Reference to Starseed concept in paper from 2010 International Planetary Probe Workshop

Hypothetical spacecraft
Interstellar travel